Argelouse is a commune of the Landes department in Nouvelle-Aquitaine in southwestern France. Made famous by being a locality in the 1927 novel Thérèse Desqueyroux by François Mauriac.

Population

See also
Communes of the Landes department
Parc naturel régional des Landes de Gascogne

References

Communes of Landes (department)